Illusions of Grandeur is the fourth studio album by Swedish death metal band Evocation. It was released on 24 September 2012 through Century Media Records. It was released on CD and vinyl.

Track listing

Personnel
Evocation
 Janne Kenttäkumpu Bodén - drums, backing vocals
 Vesa Kenttäkumpu - guitars
 Marko Palmén - guitars
 Thomas Josefsson - vocals
 Gustaf Jorde - bass

Guest musicians
 Johan Hegg - additional vocals on "Into Submission"

Miscellaneous staff
 Michał "Xaay" Loranc - artwork, cover art
 Roberto Laghi - production, mixing
 Dragan Tanasković - mastering

References

External links 

2012 albums
Evocation (band) albums
Century Media Records albums